NCAP may refer to:

 National Collection of Aerial Photography (NCAP)
 New Car Assessment Program
 The "NetCDF Arithmetic Processor", one of the NetCDF Operators
 Nation's Capital Swim Club
 No Contact Apprehension Policy